National Secondary Route 180, or just Route 180 (or ) is a National Road Route of Costa Rica, located in the Guanacaste province.

Description
In Guanacaste province the route covers Santa Cruz canton (Tempate, Cabo Velas districts).

References

Highways in Costa Rica